Liz Gorman may refer to:

 Elizabeth Ann Doody Gorman (born 1965), member of the Cook County Board of Commissioners
 Liz Gorman (American football) (born 1987), American football player